Guryongsan is a mountain of Gyeongsangbuk-do, eastern South Korea. It has an elevation of 1,346 metres.

See also
List of mountains of Korea

References

Mountains of Gangwon Province, South Korea
Mountains of North Gyeongsang Province
Yeongwol County
Bonghwa County
Mountains of South Korea
One-thousanders of South Korea